William Bixby may refer to: 

William Herbert Bixby (1849–1928), U.S. Army general and engineer
William K. Bixby (1857–1931), American art collector

See also
Bill Bixby (Wilfred Bailey Everett Bixby III, 1934–1993), American actor